The Legislative Assembly of Piauí is the unicameral legislature of the Brazilian state of Piauí. The assembly, which is seated in the state capital of Teresina, is composed of has 30 state deputies elected by proportional representation.

External links
Legislative Assembly of Piauí (in Portuguese)

Legislative Assembly of Piauí
Piauí
Piauí
Government of Piauí